N-Vinylacetamide (NVA) is a non-ionic monomer. Copolymers made of NVA and other monomers can exhibit practical characteristics in addition to those common with the existing hydrophilic polymers.

History 

NVA is an amphipathic monomer. It was introduced and compounded in the U.S. in 1967. Today, it is recognized as a monomer that does polymerize; however, Showa Denko K.K. succeeded in its industrialization in 1997.

Properties 

NVA is soluble in water, various organic solvents and  liquid vinyl monomers. It is polymerizable by various radical polymerization processes, depending on the objective.  Since NVA itself is a solvent, it can act as a dissolution agent for poorly soluble substances.

References 

Acetamides
Amide solvents
Plasticizers
Monomers
Vinyl compounds